Mam Heybeh (also Romanized as Mām Heybeh) is a village in Mangur-e Gharbi Rural District, in the Central District of Piranshahr County, West Azerbaijan Province, Iran. At the 2006 census, its population was 67, in 8 families.

References 

Populated places in Piranshahr County